Gorny is a rural locality (a village) in Arkh-Latyshsky Selsoviet, Arkhangelsky District, Bashkortostan, Russia. The population was 165 as of 2010. There are 4 streets.

Geography 
Gorny is located 11 km south of Arkhangelskoye (the district's administrative centre) by road. Krasnaya Regizla is the nearest rural locality.

References 

Rural localities in Arkhangelsky District